Jack Duffy (September 27, 1926 – May 19, 2008) was a Canadian singer, comedian and actor.

Life and career
Duffy was born in Montreal and raised in Toronto, he was then dropped out of Central Technical School to become a singer. At age 19, he was hired as a studio singer with CBC in Toronto and in 1948, he started a three-year affiliation with Tommy Dorsey, initially as a member of the vocal group Bob-O-Links. Duffy was performing as a member of the musical act the Town Criers in 1950 and would frequently appear on CBC-TV variety shows through the 1950s. In 1957, he was hired by Norman Jewison to appear as a comedian on the CBC series Showtime. Duffy had his own CBC variety show called Here's Duffy that ran from June 1958 through October 1959.

In 1961, he became a regular on Perry Como's Kraft Music Hall, performing as one of the Kraft Music Hall Players, alongside Don Adams, Paul Lynde, Kaye Ballard and others. The show finished its run in 1963.

Duffy battled alcoholism after he started drinking while on the road with the Dorsey band. His first wife left him and he became destitute, living in a $10-a-week attic. He stopped drinking in 1967 and married dancer Marylyn Stuart later that year.

In 1970, he began an 11-year run as captain of the home team on the charades game show Party Game, produced by Hamilton, Ontario-based CHCH-TV. It was through this show that Duffy picked up the nickname "Captain Jack." In 1971, he also hosted the CBC-TV series In The Mood, featuring appearances from some of the biggest names in big band jazz, including Benny Goodman and Count Basie.  Beginning in 1975, Duffy provided the voice of Boot, the cheerful, occasionally mischievous talking boot that hosted the children's educational show Readalong.  Readalong was seen on TVO, PBS and other educational networks into the early 1990s. 

Duffy died on May 19, 2008 from natural causes at age 81 in Toronto.

Filmography

Movies

Theatrical
1978: The Silent Partner - Fogelman
1979: Title Shot - Mr. Green
1986: Killer Party - Security Guard
1988: Switching Channels - Emil, the Waiter
1989: The Dream Team - Bernie
1993: Ordinary Magic - Barbershop #1
1997: Double Take - Judge
1997: Men with Guns - Jimmy
1998: Strike! - School Guard
1999: Blackheart - Enger
2000: The Spreading Ground - Owen Rafferty
2002: Fancy Dancing - Stan
2002: The Tuxedo - Elderly Man
2003: The In-Laws - The Other Uncle
2005: Lie with Me
2006: It's a Boy Girl Thing - Old Man
2009: Gooby - Grocery Store Manager

Television
1980: Boo! - Dr. Frankenstein
1981: Freddie the Freeloader's Christmas Dinner - Santa
1986: Whodunit - Narrator / The Boss
1986: Doing Life (TV Movie) - Jury Foreman
1988: Biographies: The Enigma of Bobby Bittman (TV Short) - Sam Slansky
1988: Once Upon a Giant (TV Movie) - McDermot the Hermit
1993: Ghost Mom (TV Movie) - Al
1994: David's Mother (TV Movie) - Doorman
1994: Hostage for a Day (TV Movie) - SWAT Three
1994: Sodbusters (TV Movie) - Railroad Executive No. 1
1997: The Defenders: Payback (TV Movie) - Mr. Sanders
1998: Universal Soldier III: Unfinished Business (TV Movie) - Dr. Gregor
1999: A Holiday Romance (TV Movie) - Irwin
2001: My Horrible Year! (TV Movie) - Mr. Birdwell
2001: Doc (TV Movie) - Oldest Father
2002: A Killing Spring (TV Movie) - Neighbour
2003: Death and the Maiden (TV Movie) - The grandfather

Television series
1955: The Wayne and Shuster Hour
1956: The Barris Beat - Regular
1958: Here's Duffy - Host
1961–1963: The Perry Como Show
1968: Upside Town - Eddie Power
1970–1981: Party Game
1971: In The Mood - Host
1972: Half the George Kirby Comedy Hour
1974: And That's the News, Goodnight
1975–1976: The Bobby Vinton Show - Regular Performer
1976: The Frankie Howerd Show - Wally Wheeler
1976: Readalong - (voice)
1980: Curious George - Narrator (voice)
1980: Bizarre
2000: Robocop: Prime Directives (mini-series) - Dr. Hill
2005: Corner Gas - Mr.Baker

References

External links
 

1926 births
2008 deaths
Male actors from Montreal
Male actors from Toronto
Canadian male stage actors
Canadian male television actors
Canadian sketch comedians
20th-century Canadian comedians
Comedians from Montreal
Comedians from Toronto
Canadian male comedians
Anglophone Quebec people